Brant North was a federal electoral district in Ontario, Canada, that was represented in the House of Commons of Canada from 1867 to 1893.  It was created by the British North America Act of 1867 which divided the county of Brant into two ridings: Brant North and Brant South according to a traditional division.

In 1882, the North Riding of the county of Brant was defined to consist of the townships of Ancaster, Blenheim, East Brantford and South Dumfries.

The electoral district was abolished in 1892 when it was merged into Wentworth North and Brant ridings.

Election results

See also 

 List of Canadian federal electoral districts
 Past Canadian electoral districts

References

External links 
Riding history from the Library of Parliament

Former federal electoral districts of Ontario